La Borde is a village in the Les Cayes commune of the Les Cayes Arrondissement, in the Sud department of Haiti.

It is named after Jean-Joseph de Laborde, a French financier and slaveholder.

References

Populated places in Sud (department)